"Dance Yourself Dizzy" is a 1980 song by Liquid Gold taken from their self-titled album. It was the band's biggest hit in the UK, peaking at number two and being certified silver for sales of 250,000.

Recording
Some of the members of Liquid Gold did not have great belief in the song, such as Syd Twynham; however, lead singer Ellie Hope was more hopeful for its success. Syd Twynham recalled, "We didn't think it really going to happen but we were playing a residency at Caesar's Palace in Luton and the song came on and everyone was dancing so we were really surprised when it took off the way it did".

Reception
Barry Lederer in Billboard was positive: "As with the first hit, this new release is, equally, energetic, uplifting and a step forward for the group."

Charts

Weekly charts

Year-end charts

Covers and samples
In 1999, Northern Irish DJ Paul Masterson, working under the alias Yomanda, sampled "Dance Yourself Dizzy" for his track "Synth & Strings", which reached number eight on the UK Singles Chart.

References

1980 songs
1980 singles
Disco songs